The 1979–80 season was Sport Lisboa e Benfica's 76th season in existence and the club's 46th consecutive season in the top flight of Portuguese football, covering the period from 1 July 1979 to 30 June 1980. Benfica competed domestically in the Primeira Divisão and the Taça de Portugal, and participated in the UEFA Cup after finishing second in the previous league.

Benfica began the new season hoping to prevent a third consecutive season without honours. After discarding the rule that prevented foreigners from representing Benfica, they signed their first one, Jorge Gomes. He was aided by other addictions like Carlos Manuel, João Laranjeira and second foreigner, César. Departing players included João Alves, Eurico Gomes and José Henrique. The league campaign started well and Benfica even led the league on some weeks. However, two consecutive losses, caused them to be overtaken by his rivals. They recovered ground, but with a loss against Porto in early February, the gap to the leaders increased to four points, which made it near impossible to recover. So the season fell on the Portuguese Cup, and eliminating Sporting in the round of 16 and beating Porto on the Taça de Portugal Final, Benfica won their first trophy in three seasons and first Portuguese Cup in eight.

Season summary
The new season started in an unusual situation for Benfica, as the last time they went two trophy-less seasons was in 1948. Former manager John Mortimore left at the end of his contract and was replaced by Mário Wilson. He was assisted by Peres Bandeira. The season brought significant changes because it was the first time that the club signed foreign players, after a members meet on 1 July 1978 decided to remove that prerequisite. The first foreigner to play for Benfica was Jorge Gomes. Other notable signings were Carlos Manuel, João Laranjeira and César, the latter in December. Major departures included João Alves, Eurico Gomes and José Henrique. To replace Alves, the press speculated on targets like Zico and Michel Platini, but nothing came out of it. The pre-season began on 23 July, and their opening game was on a tournament celebrating the 75 years of Schalke 04, which also included Liverpool. Afterwards, they also played in the celebrations of the 76 years of Boavista and made their presentation game against Botafogo on 17 August.

The first official match was supposed to occur on 25 August, but Benfica postponed it four days, so they could play a friendly abroad. On the 29, Benfica won 5–1 and Jorge Gomes made his historical debut. After the 0–0 draw in Clássico on match-day 3, Benfica shared first place with Porto with five points. However, in the 
UEFA Cup, the campaign was disappointing, with Benfica unexpectedly losing to Aris on the first round. On the league, Benfica dropped to second after a draw with União de Leiria, but managed to recover and catch Porto on match-day 8. A week later, they beat Sporting in the Derby de Lisboa, reaching 16 points, ex aequo with Porto in first place. The next week, Benfica lost with Varzim, losing the first place and also Chalana who had a serious injury; they conceded their second loss in a row in the reception to Boavista on match-day 11, dropping to third, four points from the leader. Wilson offered to leave. saying: "I do not have an environment to work peacefully.". Benfica reacted with four consecutive wins that 
brought them closer to first place, only a point by the end of the first half of the competition.

This recovery would not last as Benfica drew with Vitória de Setúbal on 20 January, losing a point in the race. Two weeks later, in the visit to Estádio das Antas to face Porto, Benfica lost 2–1 and opened a four-point deficit, which Wilson admitted: "is a disadvantage difficult to overcome". But February had also scheduled a Portuguese Cup match against Sporting for the round of 16, which Benfica won by 2–1. Back on the league, despite dropping points with Vitória de Guimarães in early March, Benfica kept the chase to the front two, but could not cut the distance to them, which remained at four points. On 13 April, Benfica visited Estádio de Alvalade to play Sporting, losing 3–1, with the gap to the leader Porto now at six points. Wilson complained of a "skilful" referee. Out of race, Benfica closed April with a draw against Boavista, increasing to seven the difference to the leader. May started with an away win against Varzim, for the semi-finals of the Portuguese Cup. They would meet Porto in the final for the fifth time in history. On 1 June, Benfica ended the Primeira Divisão campaign with 45 points, in third place. Not since 1954 had Benfica gone so long without winning the league. On 7 June, in the Taça de Portugal Final in a sold-out stadium, Benfica beat Porto by 1–0 with a goal from César. This win was the first in the competition since 1972 and prevented a third consecutive trophy-less season. Nevertheless, Wilson already knew he was being replaced by Lajos Baróti, as his successor arrived the day before the final.

Competitions

Overall record

Primeira Divisão

League table

Results by round

Matches

Taça de Portugal

UEFA Cup

First round

Friendlies

Player statistics
The squad for the season consisted of the players listed in the tables below, as well as staff member Mário Wilson (manager), Peres Bandeira (assistant manager), Romão Martins (Director of Football).

Transfers

In

Out

Out by loan

References

Bibliography
 
 
 

S.L. Benfica seasons
Benfica